The Women's Scratch was one of the 8 women's events at the 2009 UCI Track Cycling World Championships, held in Pruszków, Poland.

20 Cyclists from 20 different countries participated in the race. Because of the number of entries, there were no qualification rounds for this discipline. The competition consisted on 40 laps, making a total of 10 km and was run on 27 March 2009. Ellen van Dijk could not cement her reputation as the 2008 World champion and it was the 2007 World champion and 2008 silver medalist Yumari González from Cuba who won the scratch race with Elizabeth Armitstead and Belinda Goss finishing in second and third position.

Final

References

Women's scratch
UCI Track Cycling World Championships – Women's scratch
UCI